Arsia Chasmata is a steep-sided depression located northeast of Arsia Mons in the Phoenicis Lacus quadrangle on Mars, located at 7.6° S and 119.3° W.  It is 97 km long and was named after an albedo name.

In planetary geology, a chasma (plural: chasmata) is a deep, elongated, steep-sided depression.

References

See also

 Chasma
 Geology of Mars
 HiRISE

Phoenicis Lacus quadrangle
Valleys and canyons on Mars